This is a list of Catholic churches in Belarus.

Cathedrals
See: List of cathedrals in Belarus
 Cathedral of Saint Virgin Mary, Minsk
 Co-Cathedral of the Assumption of the Virgin and St. Stanislaus, Mogilev
 St. Francis Xavier Cathedral, Grodno
 Cathedral of the Merciful Jesus, Vitebsk

Basilicas
 Cathedral Basilica of the Assumption of the Blessed Virgin Mary, Pinsk

Other churches
 Church of the Assumption of the Blessed Virgin Mary, Budslau
St. Mary's Church, Grodno
 Church of Saint John the Baptist, Kamai
Church of Holy Trinity, Minsk
Church of Saints Simon and Helena, Minsk
 St. Nicholas' Church, Mir
 Transfiguration Church, Navahrudak
 Corpus Christi Church, Nesvizh
 Church of the Assumption of the Blessed Virgin Mary, Pruzhany
 Old Cathedral of St. Barbara and St. Paul, Vitebsk

See also
Catholic Church in Belarus
Belarusian Greek Catholic Church
 Byaroza Monastery
 Kalvaryja

External links
 
 Catholic.by

 
Belarus, Catholic
Belarus
Lists of religious buildings and structures in Belarus